Guyatt Park ferry wharf is located on the southern side of the Brisbane River serving the Brisbane suburb of St Lucia in Queensland, Australia. It is served by RiverCity Ferries' CityCat services.

Description
This wharf comprises a single long pier that ends in a pontoon with two docking stations. However, only one of them is used at a time due to size constraints. This terminal has a covered passenger waiting area with a Telstra pay phone and a drinking water fountain. It takes its name from the adjacent Guyatt Park.

History 
The wharf sustained moderate damage during the January 2011 Brisbane floods. It reopened after repairs on 14 February 2011.

References

External links

Ferry wharves in Brisbane
St Lucia, Queensland